The Abbey Church of St Peter and St Paul, more usually called Dorchester Abbey, is a Church of England parish church in Dorchester on Thames, Oxfordshire, about  southeast of Oxford. It was formerly a Norman abbey church and was built on the site of a Saxon cathedral.

History

Alexander, Bishop of Lincoln founded Dorchester Abbey in 1140 for the Arrouaisian Order of Augustinian Canons Regular (who wore white instead of the black of most Augustinian canons). Dorchester had been a Roman town and was later adopted by the Mercians. It had been the seat of a bishopric from AD 634 when Pope Honorius I had sent Saint Birinus, its first bishop, to that district, until 1085 when the Mercian See (hitherto at Dorchester) was transferred to Lincoln.

The abbey, founded fifty-five years later, was dedicated in honour of Saints Peter and Paul and Birinus. It was richly endowed out of the lands and tithes of the former bishopric, and had twelve parishes subject to it, being included in the Peculiar of Dorchester, until the suppression of peculiars. The first abbot appears to have been Alured, whose name occurs in records from in 1146 and again in 1163. The last was John Mershe, who was elected in 1533, and in the following year subscribed to the king's supremacy, with five of his canons, and was given a pension of £22 a year. The revenues of the abbey were valued at the time of its suppression at about £220. Henry VIII reserved the greater part of the property of the house for a college, erected by him in honour of the Holy Trinity, for a dean and prebendaries; but this was dissolved in the first year of his successor.

No register or cartulary of Dorchester Abbey is known to exist, and only a single charter, confirming the donation of a church by King John, is given by Dugdale. Edmund Ashefeld was the first impropriator of the abbey site and precincts, which afterwards passed through various hands.

Church

The church of Dorchester Abbey, as it stands today, was built entirely by the Augustinian Canons, although there are traces on the north side of Saxon masonry, probably part of the ancient cathedral. The north transept and its doorway are Norman.

The north side of the nave and chancel arch are Early English Gothic. The choir, south side of nave, south aisle are Decorated Gothic. The south porch is late Perpendicular Gothic. The very rich sanctuary, with its highly decorated windows (including the famous east window one known as the Jesse Tree window) and ornately carved sedilia and piscina, dates from 1330.

Other fittings include one of the few surviving lead fonts in England, frescoes of 1340 and several monuments, especially the well-known "swaggering knight" effigy formerly believed to be Sir John Holcombe who died in 1270 but it is more likely that it is William de Valence the Younger (died 1282  at the Battle of Llandeilo Fawr), son of William de Valence, 1st Earl of Pembroke.

Over a period of some forty years from 1845, restoration was carried out on an intermittent basis successively under the direction of four architects: James Cranston, William Butterfield, Sir George Gilbert Scott and Joseph Maltby Bignell (from 1878 to 1883). Scott had earlier employed his pupil, Bignell, as clerk of works at Dorchester [from 1859].

In 1993 a Union Jack that had been draped over the coffins of prisoners of war at Batu Lintang camp, Sarawak, Borneo was placed in the abbey together with two wooden memorial plaques; they had formerly been housed at All Saints Church, Oxford.

Burials

 Saint Birinus
 Sir John Drayton (d.1417) of Nuneham Courtenay. The Abbey contains his funerary brass.
 Wulfwig
John Stonor
Hugh Segrave

Present use

Besides being a parish church, the abbey church is a venue for concerts and cultural events of all kinds.

The alternative rock band Radiohead used the church to record orchestral sections for their albums Kid A (2000) and Amnesiac (2001).''

Between 1998 and 2006 the Dorchester Abbey Campaign Committee raised £4,000,000 and this has enabled the Church Council and the Dorchester Abbey Preservation Trust to undertake significant works in the abbey. These include the Cloister Gallery managed by the Dorchester Museum Committee and restoration of medieval and Victorian wall paintings. Dorchester Abbey Museum was longlisted for the Gulbenkian Prize in 2006. The abbey has an improved heating system and a modern kitchen and servery in the Tower room.

The abbey is open every day from 8 a.m. until dusk.

See also
List of English abbeys, priories and friaries serving as parish churches

References

Sources and further reading

External links

NFP: Dorchester Abbey, Oxfordshire
Virtual tour of Dorchester Abbey via Google Street View

1140 establishments in England
Anglo-Saxon cathedrals
Augustinian monasteries in England
Christian monasteries established in the 12th century
Church of England church buildings in Oxfordshire
Former cathedrals in England
Former Royal Peculiars
Dorchester
Monasteries in Oxfordshire
Religious organizations established in the 1140s